Stennack is a hamlet southwest of Troon in west Cornwall, England, United Kingdom.

References

Hamlets in Cornwall